36 Comae Berenices is a single star in the northern constellation of Coma Berenices. It is faintly visible to the naked eye with an apparent visual magnitude of 4.76. It is moving closer to the Earth with a heliocentric radial velocity of −1.5 km/s.

This is an evolved red giant star with a stellar classification of M0.5 III, currently on the asymptotic giant branch of the Hertzsprung–Russell diagram. This indicates it has consumed the hydrogen at its center and is now generating energy through hydrogen and helium fusion along shells surrounding an inert carbon and oxygen core. It has expanded to 43 times the radius of the Sun and is radiating 372 times the Sun's luminosity from its photosphere at an effective temperature of 3,890 K.

References

M-type giants
Coma Berenices
Durchmusterung objects
Comae Berenices, 36
112769
063355
4920